Breitenau is an Ortsgemeinde – a community belonging to a Verbandsgemeinde – in the Westerwaldkreis in Rhineland-Palatinate, Germany. Breitenau belongs to the Verbandsgemeinde of Ransbach-Baumbach, a kind of collective municipality.

Geography

The community lies in the Westerwald between Koblenz and Siegen on the rim of the Rhein-Westerwald Nature Park (Naturpark Rhein-Westerwald).

History
The village had its first mention in 1265 as Bredenowe. From 1343 until 1664 it belonged to the county of Isenburg, and then it passed to the Electorate of Trier. In 1802 it passed to the Duchy of Nassau, and eventually, in 1866, to Prussia.

Politics

The municipal council is made up of 12 council members, including the honorary and presiding mayor (Ortsbürgermeister), who were elected in a majority vote in a municipal election on 7 June 2009.

Music
Now having become an integral part of the community's, and indeed the whole Haiderbach's, life, the "St. Georgsbläser Haiderbach e.V." were founded in 1976. The club, with its 45-strong wind orchestra, is a fixture in community life and promotes musical talent among children and youths who live on the Haiderbach through a training orchestra, a youth orchestra, flute groups and early musical training. Besides appearances within the Haiderbach communities, such as at the traditional kermis, the St. Georgsbläser can always be heard at great shooting festivals, kermis parades and concerts. The yearly high point is the "Singende, klingende Haiderbach" with the Haiderbach Choir Association and the church choir, which always takes place on the first Saturday in April.

Economy and infrastructure

The A 3 with its Mogendorf interchange (AS 38) lies 6 km away. The nearest InterCityExpress stop is the railway station at Montabaur on the Cologne-Frankfurt high-speed rail line.

Notable residents
George J. Rath, founder of the Rath Packing Company, a defunct American meat packing company that lasted from 1891 to 1985

References

External links
Breitenau 

Westerwaldkreis